Hartz Chicken (also known as Hartz Chicken Buffet and Hartz Krispy Chicken 'N' Rolls) is an American fast food restaurant chain specializing in fried chicken. The company supplies more than 60 locations in Texas, mostly around the Houston metropolitan area, and Malaysia, as well as one restaurant in Shreveport, LA.

History 

W. Lawrence Hartzog Sr. (February 1, 1930 – August 29, 2004), who was a personal friend of Colonel Sanders of KFC, started Hartz Chicken under Hartzog Inc. in 1972. He opened a total of 45 units, 13 of which were company owned and 32 of which were franchised, in Texas, Mississippi, Alabama, and Georgia.

He sold the lot in 1986 to a newly formed AJP Enterprises subsidiary, Hartz Chicken Inc.

The chain began international expansion with a store in Malaysia under the name Hartz Chicken Buffet. In the late 1990s the brand opened locations in Jakarta, Indonesia and Shanghai, China, both of which later closed.

Between 1986 and July 1994, the chain was managed by George N. Samaras (CEO/Director) under Hartz Chicken International Co. which voluntarily dissolved on July 13, 1994. After transferring the chain to Hartz Restaurant International Inc., Hartz Restaurants International Inc. and Gemini Investors Inc. formed Wingstop Holdings, Inc. in 2003 and acquired Wingstop from its founder, Antonio Swad. Wingstop was sold to Roark Capital Group in 2010. The chain once opened as far as Indonesia in early 2000s but it was folded sometime before 2009.

In 2018 Hartz Franchise Restaurants, Ltd named AVVA Agency its creative agency of record. The agency begun working immediately to catalog existing assets, develop online presence and creative campaigns for the brand.
AVVA Agency's first assignment involved the creation and execution of new in-store, online and print advertising to promote a slate of new menu and products. Agency known as an author of the rebranding refreshment also. 

At some locations buffets were suspended in March 2020 to combat the COVID-19 pandemic. But pick-up and take-away services remained available.

References

External links 
 
Official Instagram page

Restaurants established in 1972
1972 establishments in Texas
American companies established in 1972
Restaurants in Texas
Fast-food poultry restaurants
Chicken chains of the United States
Companies based in Harris County, Texas
Fast-food chains of the United States